Hang is the eighth studio album by American punk rock band Lagwagon, released on October 28, 2014 on Fat Wreck Chords. It is their first in 9 years, following 2005’s Resolve and their first to feature current bassist Joe Raposo, who replaced former member Jesse Buglione. The song "Drag" was originally released in 2011 in an acoustic version on frontman Joey Cape's solo album Doesn't Play Well with Others. In February and March 2015, the band performed at Soundwave festival in Australia.

Track listing

Personnel
Joey Cape – vocals 
Chris Flippin – guitar 
Chris Rest – guitar 
Dave Raun – drums 
Joe Raposo – bass

References

External links

Hang at YouTube (streamed copy where licensed)

Lagwagon albums
2014 albums
Fat Wreck Chords albums
Albums produced by Bill Stevenson (musician)